Cymopterus is a genus of perennial plants in the family Apiaceae native to western North America. They are commonly known as the springparsleys. They are mostly stemless, taprooted perennial herbs with leaves at ground level and flowering scapes bearing yellow, white, or purple flowers.

Taxonomy
The taxonomy of this genus was described as confused in 2004, even after many decades of study. Authors have organized it in different ways, sometimes including several closely related Apiaceae genera within it. Genera recently segregated from Cymopterus include Vesper, six plants with morphological characters that are well-defined and easily separated from Cymopterus; the group has been separated before, but was reintegrated during repeated reorganizations of the genus. The number of accepted species has varied between about 50 to about 35.

Species

, Plants of the World Online accepted the following species:
Cymopterus aboriginum M.E.Jones – Indian parsnip, Indian springparsley
Cymopterus alpinus A.Gray
Cymopterus anisatus A.Gray
Cymopterus basalticus M.E.Jones – basalt springparsley
Cymopterus beckii S.L.Welsh & Goodrich – featherleaf springparsley
Cymopterus cinerarius A.Gray – gray springparsley
Cymopterus crawfordensis K.Moon, S.L.Welsh & Goodrich
Cymopterus davidsonii (J.M.Coult. & Rose) R.L.Hartm.
Cymopterus davisii R.L.Hartm. – Davis' springparsley
Cymopterus deserticola Brandegee – desert springparsley
Cymopterus douglassii R.L.Hartm. & Constance – Douglass' springparsley
Cymopterus duchesnensis M.E.Jones – Duchesne biscuitroot, Uinta Basin springparsley
Cymopterus evertii R.L.Hartm. & R.S.Kirkp. – Evert's springparsley
Cymopterus gilmanii C.V.Morton – Gilman's springparsley
Cymopterus glaucus Nutt. – smooth springparsley, waxy springparsley
Cymopterus globosus (S.Watson) S.Watson – globe springparsley
Cymopterus glomeratus (Nutt.) DC. – plains springparsley
Cymopterus goodrichii S.L.Welsh & Neese – Goodrich's springparsley, Toiyabe springparsley
Cymopterus hallii (A.Gray) B.L.Turner
Cymopterus humilis (Raf.) Tidestr.
Cymopterus jonesii J.M.Coult. & Rose – Jones' springparsley
Cymopterus longipes S.Watson – longstalk springparsley, sprawling springparsley
Cymopterus megacephalus M.E.Jones – largeleaf springparsley
Cymopterus minimus (Mathias) Mathias – Cedar Breaks springparsley
Cymopterus newberryi (S.Watson) M.E.Jones – sweetroot springparsley, sticky springparsley
Cymopterus nivalis S.Watson – snowline springparsley, Elko springparsley
Cymopterus panamintensis J.M.Coult. & Rose – Panamint springparsley
Cymopterus petraeus M.E.Jones
Cymopterus purpureus S.Watson – purple springparsley, Colorado Plateau springparsley, variable springparsley
Cymopterus ripleyi Barneby – Ripley's springparsley
Cymopterus rosei (M.E.Jones ex Coult. & Rose) M.E.Jones – Rose's springparsley
Cymopterus sessiliflorus (W.L.Theob. & C.C.Tseng) R.L.Hartm.
Cymopterus spellenbergii R.L.Hartm. & J.E.Larson
Cymopterus terebinthinus (Hook.) Torr. & A.Gray – turpentine wavewing
Cymopterus williamsii R.L.Hartm. & Constance – Williams' springparsley

Formerly included here
Vesper multinervatus (as Cymopterus multinervatus)
Vesper purpurascens (as Cymopterus purpurascens)

References

Further reading
Sun, F. J. and S. R. Downie. (2010). Phylogenetic relationships among the perennial, endemic Apiaceae subfamily Apioideae of western North America: additional data from the cpDNA trnF-trnL-trnT region continue to support a highly polyphyletic Cymopterus. Plant Diversity and Evolution 128(1-2), 151-72.

 
Apioideae genera
Flora of North America
Taxa named by Constantine Samuel Rafinesque